Alexander Jacob Lasry (born ) is an American businessperson and executive of the Milwaukee Bucks of the National Basketball Association (NBA). Lasry was a Democratic candidate in the 2022 United States Senate election in Wisconsin, but withdrew before the primary. He is the son of Milwaukee Bucks co-owner Marc Lasry.

Early life and education
Alex Lasry was born in New York City to Marc and Cathy Lasry (née Cohen). He graduated from Trevor Day School, where his mother served as a board member. He then went on to graduate cum laude with honors in Political Science from the University of Pennsylvania in 2009 and receive his MBA from the New York University Leonard Stern School of Business in 2014. His parents funded two endowed professorships at Penn.

Career
After graduating from UPenn, Lasry spent two months with the American Israel Public Affairs Committee followed by four months as an analyst with Goldman Sachs. At the time, Lasry's father was a client of Goldman Sachs. He worked in the White House during Obama Administration from 2009 to 2012. His father donated more than $500,000 to the Barack Obama 2012 presidential campaign. Lasry went on to become Special Assistant to the Chief of Staff to Senior Advisor Valerie Jarrett, and then Deputy Counselor for Strategic Engagement to the Senior Advisor where he worked on business outreach and the Jobs Council.

After receiving his MBA in 2014, Lasry moved to Milwaukee when his family purchased the Milwaukee Bucks, to serve as the team's senior vice president. Since joining the Bucks, Lasry has been on the team's management committee.

While finance chair of the Milwaukee Host Committee, Milwaukee was awarded the 2020 Democratic National Convention to be hosted at Fiserv Forum, though it later became a virtual event due to the COVID-19 pandemic. 

During his US Senate campaign, he has touted his work championing union jobs and a $15 minimum wage with the Bucks which was a requirement in the arena funding deal. Reports also show that specifics of the deal the Bucks agreed to for public financing said they did not have to institute a universal $15 minimum wage until 2023. As such, the team was still hiring non-union labor at a rate of $12.50 to $14/hr depending on experience levels for many years and Deer District workers were only earning $10 an hour as of May 2019. The team has said they had agreed to speed up the deal and started paying a $15 minimum wage in 2020.  

Lasry has been involved in Bucks' conflict with the unions caused by hiring non-union workers with lower wages which team reps originally described as "a matter of economics".  Lasry also continues to own shares in Amazon, which he has refused to sell, despite criticizing the company.

While running for US Senate, Alex received an extension in May 2022 to not disclose his financial assets until after the Wisconsin Democratic Senate Primary in August 2022. 

In August 2020, when members of the Bucks supposedly leaked to NBA reporter Shams Charania that they were attempting to reach Wisconsin Attorney General Josh Kaul after the Kenosha police shooting of Jacob Blake, records show that Lasry texted a staffer of Kaul's to say that he "yelled at the players" over the leak.

Lasry was accused of cutting in line because he received his COVID vaccine at the time when only seniors were eligible for shots in Wisconsin. He said his wife's uncle contacted her about unused doses that would go to waste. She declined the shot because of her pregnancy, and Lasry took it instead.

Political positions 
Lasry has expressed support for a $15 minimum wage, the Protecting the Right to Organize Act, the notion of eliminating the filibuster, and the John Lewis Voting Rights Act.

Personal life
Lasry lives in Milwaukee with his wife and daughter in a historic mansion on Milwaukee's east side.

References

External links

1980s births
21st-century American businesspeople
American people of Moroccan-Jewish descent
Businesspeople from Milwaukee
Businesspeople from New York City
Candidates in the 2022 United States Senate elections
Living people
Milwaukee Bucks executives
New York University Stern School of Business alumni
Obama administration personnel
University of Pennsylvania alumni
Wisconsin Democrats